Elections for local government were held in Northern Ireland on 7 June 2001, contesting 582 seats in all, along with the 2001 general election across the entire United Kingdom.

Results

Overall

By council

Antrim

Ards

Armagh

Ballymena

Ballymoney

Banbridge

Belfast

Carrickfergus

Castlereagh

Coleraine

Cookstown

Craigavon

Derry

Down

Dungannon

Fermanagh

Larne

Limavady

Lisburn

Magherafelt

Moyle

Newry and Mourne

Newtownabbey

North Down

Omagh

Strabane

References

 
Council elections in Northern Ireland
Local elections
Northern Ireland
Northern Ireland
2001 elections in Northern Ireland